Sándor Farkas (born 19 January 1961) is a Hungarian boxer. He competed in the men's bantamweight event at the 1980 Summer Olympics. At the 1980 Summer Olympics, he lost in his fight to Juan Hernandez of Cuba.

References

External links
 

1961 births
Living people
Hungarian male boxers
Olympic boxers of Hungary
Boxers at the 1980 Summer Olympics
People from Salgótarján
Bantamweight boxers
Sportspeople from Nógrád County
20th-century Hungarian people